Furkan Soyalp (born 12 June 1995) is a Turkish professional footballer who plays as an attacking midfielder for Adana Demirspor on loan from Gaziantep. He made his Süper Lig debut on 19 May 2013 against Gençlerbirliği.

References

External links
 
 

1995 births
Association football midfielders
Bandırmaspor footballers
Bursaspor footballers
Gaziantep F.K. footballers
İstanbul Başakşehir F.K. players
Adana Demirspor footballers
Living people
People from Yenimahalle
Süper Lig players
TFF First League players
TFF Second League players
Turkey youth international footballers
Turkish footballers